妖怪 ("bewitching spectre") may refer to:

 Yōkai, supernatural monsters in Japanese folklore
 Yaoguai, supernatural monsters in Chinese folklore